The University of Central Florida's Libraries is a university library system that is administered by the University of Central Florida, a metropolitan public research university located in Orlando, Florida, United States. The system, which stretches across Central Florida, includes eleven libraries of the university and provides primary support to all academic programs.

The libraries serve UCF's students and faculty, and paid memberships are available to local residents. The system includes two branch libraries, seven regional campus libraries, in addition to the main library, the Harriet F. Ginsburg Health Sciences Library at the College of Medicine, Lake Nona and a research library at the Florida Solar Energy Center. As is common in research libraries, library materials are housed in a variety of locations depending upon discipline. The current Director of Libraries is Barry Baker.

Collection
UCF Libraries collections include over 2 million print volumes, 3 million microforms, 300,000 government documents, 10,000 full text electronic journal subscriptions, 600,000 e-books, 40,000 media titles, a base of 17,000 serial subscriptions, in addition to special collections and university archives materials.

The libraries have also built a number of research collections. Notable collections within the library include the Malkoff Book Arts Collection, the Van Sickle Leftist Pamphlet collection, the Bryant West Indies collection, collections of materials on tourism and hospitality, the West Indies, the Everglades, and materials on the history of Central Florida. The main campus library, named after UCF's fourth president John C. Hitt, also houses the university archives. The archives hold publications and records of UCF dating back to its founding as Florida Technological University in 1963. During the course of the year, collections and materials are often on display in the main lobby of the John C. Hitt Library.

The Libraries also serve as partial depository for both United States and Florida government publications. UCF Libraries is a partner within the State University System of Florida Libraries.

Currently, the library is working on its 21st Century Library Project, a multi-phased plan designed to create additional space for student learning, technology, collaboration, and research expansion. The project upon completion will include the construction of a four-story automated retrieval center, increased quiet study space, and the creation of additional research and writing facilities on the fifth floor.

Branches

Other library collections

See also
George A. Smathers Libraries
Orange County Library System
State University System of Florida
State University System of Florida Libraries

References

External links
 UCF
 UCF Libraries

Education in Brevard County, Florida
Education in Orange County, Florida
Education in Seminole County, Florida
University and college academic libraries in the United States
University of Central Florida
Libraries in Florida